Dominique Brossard is professor and chair in the Department of Life Sciences Communication at the University of Wisconsin-Madison. She is on the steering committee of the UW-Madison Robert & Jean Holtz Center for Science and Technology Studies and is an affiliate of the UW-Madison Center for Global Studies and Morgridge Institute for Research. She is also the leader of the Societal Implications of Nanotechnology group in the Nanoscale Science and Engineering Center (NSEC), funded by the National Science Foundation. Her teaching responsibilities include courses in strategic communication theory and research, with a focus on science and risk communication.

Her research program concentrates on the intersection of science, media, and policy in the department’s Science, Media and the Public (SCIMEP) research group. She is a fellow of the American Association for the Advancement of Science and a former board member of the International Network of Public Communication of Science and Technology. SCIMEP’s recent work has focused on scientific discourse in online environments, such as Twitter. This work includes research contributing toward understanding of Online Incivility or "The Nasty Effect". She has published numerous research articles in outlets such as Science, Science Communication, the International Journal of Public Opinion, Public Understanding of Science, and Communication Research

Brossard spent five years at Accenture in its Change Management Services Division. She was also the communication coordinator for the Agricultural Biotechnology Support Project II (ABSPII), a position combining public relations with marketing and strategic communication. Her family worked on dairy farms for many generations.

Brossard earned her M.S. in plant biotechnology from the Ecole Nationale d’Agronomie de Toulouse and her M.P.S and Ph.D. in communication from Cornell University

References

University of Wisconsin–Madison faculty
Year of birth missing (living people)
Living people